Whitmore Township is located in Macon County, Illinois. As of the 2010 census, its population was 4,471 and it contained 1,915 housing units.

Cities and towns 
 Larkdale
 Oreana

Adjacent townships 
 Friends Creek Township (north)
 Willow Branch Township, Piatt County (northeast, east and southeast)
 Oakley Township (south)
 Decatur Township (south and southwest)
 Hickory Point Township (west)
 Maroa Township (northwest)

Geography

Demographics

References

External links

US Census
City-data.com
Illinois State Archives

Townships in Macon County, Illinois
Townships in Illinois